The Daily Express is one of Pakistan's most widely circulated Urdu-language newspapers.

It is published simultaneously from Islamabad, Karachi, Lahore, Peshawar, Quetta, Multan, Faisalabad, Gujranwala, Sargodha, Rahim Yar Khan and Sukkar.

See also
Express News, TV News Channel started by Daily Express

References

Daily newspapers published in Pakistan
Urdu-language newspapers published in Pakistan
Lakson Group